Melanie Harris Higgins is an American official and diplomat who has served as the United States Ambassador to Burundi since March 2, 2021.

Education 

Higgins earned a Bachelor of Arts from Johns Hopkins University and an Master of Arts from the Paul H. Nitze School of Advanced International Studies.

Career 

Higgins is a career member of the Senior Foreign Service, class of Counselor. During her two decades of service, Higgins served as the Acting Director and Acting Public Affairs Advisor for the State Department's Bureau of East Asian and Pacific Affairs. She also held a number of other positions at the State Department in Washington, D.C., Jakarta, Indonesia, Canberra, Australia, and Yaounde, Cameroon. She has served as  the Principal Officer of the United States Consulate General in Auckland, New Zealand and was the Deputy Chief of Mission of the United States Embassy in Port Moresby, Papua New Guinea. She currently serves as Director of the Office of Central African Affairs at the State Department.

Ambassador to Burundi 

On May 1, 2020, President Donald Trump announced his intent to nominate Higgins to be the next United States Ambassador to Burundi. On May 19, 2020, her nomination was sent to the Senate. On November 18, 2020, her nomination was confirmed in the United States Senate by voice vote. She took the oath of office on January 13, 2021. On March 2, 2021, she presented her credentials to President Évariste Ndayishimiye.

Awards 

In 2010, she received the Sinclaire Language Award from the American Foreign Service Association.

Personal life 

Higgins speaks French, Indonesian, and some Bosnian.

See also
List of ambassadors of the United States

References

Living people
Year of birth missing (living people)
Place of birth missing (living people)
21st-century American diplomats
21st-century American women
Ambassadors of the United States to Burundi
American consuls
American women diplomats
Johns Hopkins University alumni
Paul H. Nitze School of Advanced International Studies alumni
United States Department of State officials
United States Foreign Service personnel